Via degli specchi is a 1982 Italian crime-drama film directed by Giovanna Gagliardo. It was entered into the 33rd Berlin International Film Festival.

Cast
 Nicole Garcia as Francesca
 Milva as Veronica
 Heinz Bennent as Gianfranco
 Claudio Bigagli as Giuseppe
 Massimo Serato as Councillor Bianchi
 Adèle Aste
 Carlo Cartier
 Rita Frei
 Girolamo Marzano
 Cristina Rinaldi (as Adele Cristina Rinaldi)

See also       
 List of Italian films of 1982

References

External links

1982 films
1980s Italian-language films
1982 crime drama films
Films directed by Giovanna Gagliardo
Films scored by Pino Donaggio
Italian crime drama films
1980s Italian films